The Aninoasa is a left tributary of the river Olt in Romania. It flows into the Olt near Bârsești, south of Râmnicu Vâlcea.

References

Rivers of Romania
Rivers of Vâlcea County